Stibaroma is a genus of moths in the family Geometridae described by Edward Guest in 1887. Both species are known from Australia.

Species
Stibaroma melanotoxa Guest, 1887
Stibaroma aphronesa (Lower, 1902)

References

Nacophorini